Patricio Moreno Ruiz (born 21 March 1977), commonly known as Patri, is a Spanish retired footballer who played as a midfielder, and is the current assistant manager of Valencia CF.

Career
Born in Don Benito, Badajoz, Extremadura, Patri started his career with hometown side CD Don Benito. After representing CF Extremadura's reserves, he joined Tercera División's Alicante CF in 2000, achieving immediate promotion and being an undisputed starter as his side finished sixth in the 2001–02 Segunda División B.

Patri signed for Segunda División side Polideportivo Ejido in 2002, and made his professional debut on 1 September of that year by starting in a 0–0 away draw against SD Eibar. After two seasons at the club, he moved to Hércules CF in the third division, helping the side achieve promotion but being rarely used afterwards.

Patri was a regular starter in his following two clubs, Águilas CF (where he scored a career-best eight goals) and CD Alcoyano, before returning to the second division with Elche CF. Again rarely used (only four starts, 363 minutes of action), he went on to resume his career in the lower leagues, representing AD Cerro de Reyes and CD La Muela during the 2010–11 campaign, with both clubs folding until the end of it.

In 2011, Patri returned to Don Benito, where he retired in March 2017 at the age of nearly 40. He immediately started working as Juancho Pozo's assistant at the very same club.

On 8 August 2019, Patri was appointed José Bordalás' assistant at La Liga club Getafe CF.

References

External links

1977 births
Living people
People from Don Benito
Sportspeople from the Province of Badajoz
Spanish footballers
Footballers from Extremadura
Association football midfielders
Segunda División players
Segunda División B players
Tercera División players
Alicante CF footballers
Polideportivo Ejido footballers
Hércules CF players
Águilas CF players
CD Alcoyano footballers
Elche CF players
CD La Muela players
Getafe CF non-playing staff